
Jarosław County is a unit of territorial administration and local government (powiat) in Subcarpathian Voivodeship, south-eastern Poland, on the border with Ukraine. It came into being on January 1, 1999, as a result of the Polish local government reforms passed in 1998.

As of 2019 its total population was 120,462, out of which the population of Jarosław was 37,585, that of Radymno was 5,279, that of Próchnik was 3,764, and the rural population was 73,834.

Neighbouring counties
Jarosław County is bordered by Przemyśl County to the south, Przeworsk County to the west and Lubaczów County to the east. It also borders Ukraine to the east.

Administrative division
The county is subdivided into 11 gminas (two urban, one urban-rural and eight rural). These are listed in the following table, in descending order of population.

References

 
Land counties of Podkarpackie Voivodeship